Khanandabil-e Gharbi Rural District is in the Central District of Khalkhal County, Ardabil province, Iran. At the census of 2006, its population was 5,572 in 1,351 households; there were 5,550 inhabitants in 1,578 households at the following census of 2011; and in the most recent census of 2016, the population of the rural district was 4,237 in 1,373 households. The largest of its 24 villages was Lameh Dasht, with 977 people.

References 

Khalkhal County

Rural Districts of Ardabil Province

Populated places in Ardabil Province

Populated places in Khalkhal County